Anthony Hume Dilweg (born March 28, 1965) is a former American football player and the current founder and CEO of Dilweg, a leading Southern commercial real estate investment firm. Before entering the world of real estate, he played football professionally as a quarterback for the Green Bay Packers of the National Football League (NFL) from 1989 to 1990. Dilweg attended Walt Whitman High School in Bethesda, Maryland, graduating in the class of 1984, followed by Duke University, graduating in the class of 1989. Anthony Dilweg founded Dilweg in 1999 after spending years as a commercial real estate broker and growing his own real estate investment portfolio. Since its beginnings, the firm has acquired more than $1.34 billion in asset value and more than 11.1 million square feet throughout the South. In recent years, the firm shed many of the non-strategic assets and concentrated the majority of acquisitions on Class-A office buildings, primarily in the Atlanta, Charlotte, Nashville, Tampa, Dallas, and Raleigh-Durham metros. In the process, the firm established itself as a high-quality investor and operator of opportunistic and value-added, middle-market ($15 million to $100 million) office assets. With offices in Durham, Atlanta, Charlotte, and Tampa, Dilweg is a full-service real estate organization, whose mission is to deliver long-term value to its investors, tenants, and the community.

College career
Anthony graduated from Duke University in 1989 with a dual degree in psychology and drama. While attending Duke, he played under coach Steve Spurrier and was named the 1988 ACC Football Player of the Year and the offensive MVP of the 1989 Hula Bowl. Dilweg holds the Duke single season record for passing yards with 3,824 in the 1988 season.

Professional career
Before entering the world of real estate, Anthony Dilweg spend three years in the NFL. He was selected in the third round of the 1989 NFL Draft with the 74th overall pick by the Green Bay Packers where he played two seasons as quarterback from 1989 to 1990. The Duke alum’s third year was a member of the 1992 Los Angeles Raiders and Montreal Machine of the World League where he rounded out his professional football career.  Dilweg is one of only 17 players to be selected in the NFL draft out of Duke. Dilweg's best NFL season was 1990 when he played 9 games with the Packers and threw for 1,267 yards and 8 touchdowns.

Personal life
Today Dilweg is the Chairman of the Dilweg Companies, a real estate development company, and a sideline reporter for Duke.  Dilweg and his wife, Jamie, have two daughters, Peyton and Erin, and one son, JP.

Anthony’s great grandfather, Lavern Dilweg was a Pro Bowl tight end for the Packers from 1927-1934. His grandmother Eleanor Coleman competed in the 1924 Summer Olympics, as a swimmer.

References

External links
 The Dilweg Companies
 Statistics at databaseFootball

1965 births
Living people
American football quarterbacks
Duke Blue Devils football players
Green Bay Packers players
Montreal Machine players
People from Bethesda, Maryland
Players of American football from Maryland
Players of American football from Washington, D.C.
Walt Whitman High School (Maryland) alumni